Nyamozero is a rural locality (a Station) in Kandalakshskiy District of Murmansk Oblast, Russia. The village is located beyond the Arctic circle. It is 174 m above sea level.

References

Rural localities in Murmansk Oblast
Kandalakshsky District